Ariel Guarco was recently elected as President of the International Cooperative Alliance, and is a cooperative leader that has undertaken a cooperative movement development process in his country and has built strong bonds with the rest of the cooperative movement in the American continent by becoming Cooperatives of the Americas’ Board member and through other regional integration sectors.

Early life 
Guarco was born in Coronel Pringles, a small Argentine town. He was raised inside a cooperative; his mother has worked in the Electric Cooperative of the town for 50 years.

Professional career 
A man trained into the public services cooperative movement, and specially the electric cooperative movement, during the course of his life he has moved along all institutional positions until today, when he runs the Presidency of COOPERAR, apex organization in the Argentine cooperative movement, and he's member of the International Co-operative Alliance's Global Board.

He started in the cooperative movement over 20 years ago in his home town Electric Cooperative, holding different positions until the presidency, which he holds since 2007. In 2008 he was elected President of the Cooperative Federation of Electricity and Public Services of Buenos Aires – FEDECOBA –, a position he still runs nowadays.

He is the President of the Cooperative Confederation of the Argentine Republic since 2011.

He is Member of the International Co-operative Alliance's Global Board since 2013 and Deputy Vice-President of Cooperatives of the Americas since 2014. Also in 2013 he met Pope Francis during an audience he held with leaders of ICA at the Vatican.

He is a regular speaker in different Universities, Seminars, Conferences and Congresses related to the Solidary Economy sector both in his home country and in foreign countries.

He is the author of the book “The Argentine Cooperative Movement – A hopeful Look into the Future”.

Publications 
Guarco is the author of the book, The Argentine Cooperative Movement – A hopeful Look into the Future.

References 

Living people
Year of birth missing (living people)
People from Coronel Pringles